Casteel High School is a junior high and high school in Queen Creek, Arizona, the fifth public high school operated by the Chandler Unified School District.
It opened in July 2015 and is named for Camille Casteel, superintendent of the district. The CUSD governing board changed its policy about naming schools after current staff specifically wished to name the school after Casteel.

The school's first principal, Sandy Lundberg, died on June 26, 2018, after a long battle with stage four cancer. The school library was named in her honor a short time before her death.

References

Schools in Maricopa County, Arizona
Educational institutions established in 2015
Public high schools in Arizona
Buildings and structures in Chandler, Arizona
2015 establishments in Arizona